Chitrakoot Airport is an under-construction domestic airport which will serve the city of Chitrakoot, Uttar Pradesh, India. It is  located at Dewangna in Chitrakoot district,  from the city centre. The existing airstrip with a runway is currently owned by the Civil Aviation Department of the Government of Uttar Pradesh.
In January 2019, the State Government decided to expand the airstrip and construct an airport terminal by acquiring additional land from the forest department.

The airport has a pre-fabricated passenger terminal covering 525 square metres and can accommodate 20 arriving and 20 departing passengers.
In October 2020, Gurugram-based Aviation Connectivity and Infrastructure Developers Pvt Ltd won the rights to operate flights from the airport to Kanpur, Allahabad and Varanasi, under the government's UDAN Regional Connectivity Scheme. Currently, the airport is not operational, and the terminal is being handled only for private operations. To make it a full-fledged commercial airport, it is undergoing expansion, which includes a new 2,500 metre runway, suitable for handling Airbus A320 and Boeing 737 type aircraft, an apron and a new passenger terminal. Before the completion of the expansion project, the existing terminal is announced to restart operations, and for that, is expected to get the license within 4-5 months from now, as of February 2023. The expansion project is expected to be completed by 2024.

References

Airports in Uttar Pradesh
Proposed airports in Uttar Pradesh
Chitrakoot district